Chatsworth is a large township in KwaZulu-Natal, South Africa established in the 1950s to segregate the Indian population and create a buffer between the white suburbs of Durban to the north and the black townships of Durban to the south. Located in the Southern Durban basin and roughly bordered by the Umhlatuzana River in the North and Umlaas River in the south, the suburb is made up mainly of Indian/Asian and Black African people.

History
In the 1940s, the Pegging Acts and the Asiatic Land Tenure and Indian Representation Act, 1946 were passed. These acts gave the government the right to remove and destroy shacks and small self-made shelters, with the putative intention of improving sanitary conditions. This led to the Group Areas Act of June 1950 being enforced directly by the Government, in which certain residential areas were designated for Whites, Indians, Coloureds, and Blacks only. Indians were removed from areas such as Mayville, Cato Manor, Clairwood, Magazine Barracks, Bluff, Riverside, Prospect Hall, Duikerfontein, and Sea Cow Lake. They were forcibly moved into the two townships of Phoenix, situated North of Durban, and Chatsworth to the South.

During the late 1940s and early 1950s, there were advertisements in papers for an exclusively Indian town, Umhlatuzana. This progressed into the greater Chatsworth District in the early 1960s when planning commenced and official movements took place in 1964 to the eleven units: Unit 1, 2, 3, 5, 6, 7, 9, 10, and Unit 11. Modern day Chatsworth is spread over seven municipal wards which all fall roughly in the South Central municipal area. The intentional buffer design of Chatsworth creates today an interesting melting pot of people frequenting Chatsworth's business district  which comprises a bustling center, The Chatsworth Center.

Notable landmarks

 Gandhi Centenary Park
 Chatsworth’s Bangladesh Market (Oldest market in Chatsworth)
 Sri Sri Radha Radhanath Temple (Hare Krishna Temple) 
 Lord Hanuman Statue, Shri Vishnu Temple (Tallest in Africa)
 Christian Revival Centre 
 Magazine Barracks Temple
 Revival Ministries 
 Chatsworth center 
 Al Meen Masjid 
 Chatsworth Stadium
 Dees Hiring Centre

Education

South Africa's Indian population, culturally has placed an emphasis on education during times when Apartheid Laws prevented intellectual and material development of non-white races, believing only whites were capable of enquiry of the mathematic and scientific fields. As a result of resistance, the Indian population has excelled academically and have produced many academics who are former inhabitants of Chatsworth. Most secondary schools in Chatsworth boast pass rates above 90 per cent for the Matric Examinations despite lacking resources and facilities. Arena Park Secondary School, Apollo Secondary School, Crossmoor Secondary School, Southlands Secondary School and Kharwastan Secondary School regularly produce learners that are placed in the provincial Top 30. Arena Park Secondary School, Crossmoor Secondary School, Southlands Secondary School and Kharwastan Secondary School regularly have matric pass rates of 90% to 100%, with Crossmoor Secondary School and Arena Park Secondary School generally ranking high in the Umlazi district.

Public Secondary Schools
Apollo Secondary School, Collier Avenue, Umhlatuzana Township
Arena Park Secondary School, Rose Heights Drive, Arena Park
Asoka Secondary School, Skyridge Circle, Moorton
Brindhaven Secondary School, Road No 706, Montford
Chatsworth Secondary School, Lenny Naidu Drive (Pelican Drive), Bayview
Crossmoor Secondary School, Golden Poppy Crescent, Crossmoor
Glenover Secondary School, Glenover Rd, Westcliff
Kharwastan Secondary School, Iris Avenue, Kharwastan
Marklands Secondary School, Himalaya Drive, Shallcross
Meadowlands School of Technology, Road 734, Montford 
Montarena Secondary School, Road 706, Montford
Newhaven Secondary School, Croftdene Road, Croftdene
Protea Secondary School, Road 257, Bayview
Risecliff Secondary School, Blue Jill Crescent, Risecliff
Shallcross Secondary School, Alpine Drive, Shallcross
Southlands Secondary School, Havenside Drive, Havenside
Welbedene Secondary School, Road 749, Montford
Westcliff Secondary School, Florence Nightingale Drive, Westcliff
Wingen Heights Secondary School, Wingen Walk, Shallcross
Witteklip Secondary School, Witteklip Street, Croftdene
Woodhurst Secondary School, Woodhurst Drive, Woodhurst

Police training Academy
SAPS Academy Chatsworth.

Infrastructure 

Chatsworth Had seen most of its development since 1960- to 1980 due to the group areas act, which segregated people based on race. This saw the construction of the entire town from the ground up.

Major infrastructure includes all the roads, and railways. The M1 Higginson Highway runs through the town from Mobeni in the East to Mariannhill in the West. It serves as the artery of Chatsworth linking all 11 Units and surrounding areas.

Alongside the highway is a railroad operated by PRASA, linking some units of Chatsworth directly to Isipingo, Durban South and the greater Durban CBD.

The most recent private development is the construction of the Ridge Shopping mall, in Shallcross.

Nelson Mandela Community Youth Centre 
The development of the Chatsworth Youth Center was initialized by former president Nelson Mandela, following the deaths of several teenagers at the Throb Nightclub. It serves as a multi purpose facility for youth to engage on societal issues.

Current situation
Indian people in Chatsworth are from various religious groups. Many masjids, temples, and churches are present. One of many famous masjids is Habibia Manzil in Shallcross. As a consequence of its history, Chatsworth still has a predominantly Indian population. It is a center of Indian culture, and holds the Temple of Understanding – a Hindu temple. Many Indians from Hindi, Tamil and Telugu backgrounds are present. Such Indian languages are still spoken at home in many instances, with learning classes set up to aid in their development.

This area has developed into a fully fledged post apartheid suburb of the Durban eThekwini Municipality.

See also
African Wanderers F.C.

References

External links
 Chatsworth Live

Former Indian townships in South Africa
Populated places in eThekwini Metropolitan Municipality
Townships in KwaZulu-Natal